The Third Army was a field army of the British Army during World War I that saw active service on the Western Front throughout the war.

First World War
The Third Army was part of the British Army during World War I and was formed in France on 13 July 1915, under the command of Lieutenant-General Charles Monro.

During August 1915 the Third Army took over trench line south of the French Tenth Army, which had to keep in position for the forthcoming autumn offensive. This made the Third Army geographically separate from the other British Armies for the time being. This remained the case until March 1916, when the French Tenth Army was redeployed because of French losses at Verdun and the British Fourth Army was formed in preparation for the Battle of the Somme.

The battles it took part in on the Western Front included:
 Battle of the Somme
 Battle of Cambrai
 Second Battle of Arras (April 1917)
 Battle of Passchendaele
 Battle of Amiens (August 1918)
 Hundred Days Offensive

Order of battle
Third Army Order of Battle, August 1918.

 IV Corps
 37th Division
 42nd (East Lancashire) Infantry Division
62nd (2nd West Riding) Division
New Zealand Division
5th Division
 V Corps
21st Division
38th (Welsh) Infantry Division
17th (Northern) Division
33rd Division
 VI Corps
 Guards Division
 2nd Division
 3rd Division
 59th (2nd North Midland) Division
 XVII Corps
 51st (Highland) Division
 52nd Division
56th (London) Infantry Division
57th (2nd West Lancashire) Division
63rd (Royal Naval) Division

Commanders

 General Charles Monro (July 1915 – September 1915)
 General Edmund Allenby (23 October 1915 – 9 June 1917)
 General Sir Julian Byng (9 June 1917 – 22 March 1919)

Second World War

The army was not reraised during the Second World War. However, due to various Allied deception efforts, German intelligence over-estimated the number of Allied forces based within the UK by the start of 1944. While there was no specific deception effort to create the Third Army, German intelligence believed that one had been formed from Northern Command.

References

Sources
 
 

03
3